Lake Mohawk or Mohawk Lake may refer to:

 Mohawk Lake (Waterford Township, Michigan), a lake
 Lake Mohawk (Mississippi), a reservoir
 Lake Mohawk (Ohio), a reservoir
 Lake Mohawk, New Jersey, a census-designated place
 Lake Mohawk (New Jersey), a private lake formed by a dam in the community